Gerônimo dos Santos Oliveira (born July 1, 1989 in Riachão do Jacuípe), known as Gerônimo, is a Brazilian footballer who plays as a right back for J. Malucelli.

Career statistics

References

External links

1989 births
Living people
Brazilian footballers
Association football defenders
Club Athletico Paranaense players